A by-election was held for the New South Wales Legislative Assembly electorate of Cobar on 2 December 1911 because of the death of Donald Macdonell.

Macdonell had been absent because he was unwell but he was expected to recover. His seat had been declared vacant as he was absent for an entire session. He was unopposed at the resulting by-election, however he died three weeks later.

Dates

Result

The by-election caused by the death of Donald Macdonell.

See also
Electoral results for the district of Cobar
List of New South Wales state by-elections

References

1911 elections in Australia
New South Wales state by-elections
1910s in New South Wales